is a former Japanese football player.

Club career
Sugiyama was born in Shizuoka on January 24, 1985. He joined Shimizu S-Pulse from youth team in 2003. He played as defensive midfielder. In 2008, he moved to Kashiwa Reysol on loan. He returned to S-Pulse in 2010. Although in 2010, he could hardly play in the match for injury, his opportunity to play increased from 2011. He could hardly play in the match from 2016 and retired end of 2017 season.

National team career
In September 2001, Sugiyama was selected Japan U-17 national team for 2001 U-17 World Championship, but he did not play in the match.

Club statistics

References

External links

Profile at Shimizu S-Pulse

1985 births
Living people
Association football people from Shizuoka Prefecture
Japanese footballers
J1 League players
J2 League players
Shimizu S-Pulse players
Kashiwa Reysol players
Association football midfielders